Ormocarpum klainei is a species of plant in the family Fabaceae. It is found in Cameroon and Gabon. Its natural habitat is subtropical or tropical dry forests. It is threatened by habitat loss.

References

Dalbergieae
Flora of Cameroon
Flora of Gabon
Critically endangered plants
Taxonomy articles created by Polbot